Parliamentary elections were held in Montenegro on 27 September 1911.

Background
These were the first parliamentary elections in Montenegro after the state was declared the Kingdom in 1910. Although the True People's Party was the only legal political organization in the country, a group of members of the banned opposition People's Party ran as independent candidates.

Results
The elections resulted in the re-election of Prime Minister Lazar Tomanović and True People's Party government, which was unconditionally loyal to Nicholas I. Tomanović's government was returned to office with a large majority.

Aftermath
Parliament of Montenegro reconvened on 31 October. However, when the President of the Parliament was elected on 11 December, the government candidate was defeated, leading to the government resigning.

References

Montenegro
Elections in Montenegro
1911 in Montenegro
September 1911 events